Kingdom (stylized in all caps) is a South Korean boy band formed by GF Entertainment in 2021. The group debuted with seven members: Dann, Arthur, Mujin, Louis, Ivan, Jahan and Chiwoo. The group released their first EP entitled History of Kingdom: Part I. Arthur on February 18, 2021. In May 2022, Chiwoo terminated his contract with the agency and left the group. And the new member, Hwon joined three months later.

History

Pre-debut
Dann and Arthur are former members of the group Varsity. Dann also participated in JTBC's Mix Nine, finishing in 71st place among male contestants.

2021: Debut
Kingdom debuted on February 18, 2021, with the release of their first EP, History of Kingdom: Part I. Arthur, and lead single "Excalibur". Their second EP, History of Kingdom: Part II. Chiwoo, and its lead single, "Karma", was released on July 1.  Their third EP, History of Kingdom: Part III. Ivan, and its lead single, "Black Crown", was released on October 21.

2022: History of Kingdom: Part IV. Dann, Chiwoo's departure, addition of Hwon, History of Kingdom: Part V. Louis 
Their fourth EP, History of Kingdom: Part IV. Dann, was released on March 31, and being delayed from March 17 after Arthur and Mujin tested positive for COVID-19. On May 25, Chiwoo terminated his contract with GF Entertainment citing "personal reasons" and left the group.

On August 31, Hwon was introduced as the newest member of the group. He will make his debut with them in their upcoming fifth EP, History of Kingdom: Part V. Louis, to be released on October 5.

Members
Adapted from their Naver Profile.

 Dann (단)
 Arthur (아서)
 Mujin (무진)
 Louis  (루이)
 Ivan (아이반)
 Jahan (자한)
 Hwon (훤)

Former
 Chiwoo (치우) (2021-2022)

Discography

Extended plays

Singles

Awards and nominations

References

2021 establishments in South Korea
Musical groups from Seoul
K-pop music groups
Musical groups established in 2021
South Korean dance music groups
South Korean boy bands
Peak Time contestants